Qahqaheh Castle is a castle located 85 kilometres away from Meshginshahr in Ardabil Province, Iran. This castle was built in the mountains and was used as a jail for anti-kingdom politicians during the Safavid dynasty. Ismail II, the third king of the Safavid dynasty was the most famous person who was imprisoned in Qahqaheh Castle.

Resources 

Castles in Iran
16th century in Iran
Archaeological sites in Iran
Buildings and structures in Ardabil Province

National works of Iran